Syed Ahmad Syed Abdul Rahman Alhadad or better known as Altimet (born 27 November 1978) is a Malaysian composer, lyricist, actor and former singer. He was a former member of the Teh Tarik Crew group which achieved success between 1999 and 2007. He has announced that his career as a singer after he 40th birthday has ended, but will still receive an offer to compose songs on behalf of others.

Early life 
Altimet was born on 27 November 1978, in Petaling Jaya, Selangor and is the son of Syed Abdul Rahman bin Syed Ali Alhadad and Sharifah Jamalah binti Syed Agil Alsagoff. He received his early education at Sekolah Kebangsaan Subang Jaya and Sekolah Kebangsaan Raja Muda, Shah Alam and furthered his secondary education at Sekolah Menengah Kebangsaan (Men) Bukit Bintang, Petaling Jaya and Mara Muar Junior Science College, Johor. He then furthered his studies at the university level at the International Medical University in Bukit Jalil, Kuala Lumpur. Altimet was first exposed to hip hop music since the age of 11, the song "Bring The Noise" singing Antrax and Public Enemy sparked his interest in hip hop music.

Career

Music 
Altimet began his music career by joining a band Teh Tarik Crew established in 1999. It is also accompanied by Mizz Nina, DJ Fuzz and Fiquetional. Along with the band, Altimet released three albums with TTC, Are We Rap Stars Now (1999), How's The Level? (2002) and What's Next? (2004). After the band disbanded in 2007, he began his solo career.

In November 2013, Altimet collaborated with The Singaporean singer, Awi Rafael through a song "Kalau Aku Kaya".

In 2016, Altimet came up with the single "Memang Mudah" in which he collaborated with rapper, Sasi The Don and Maya Hanum. The song was recorded in conjunction with the advertising company's 9th anniversary, Mudah.my.

He was the winner of the Best Performance category trophy through the song Amboi on Anugerah Juara Lagu (AJL) Ke-32 on 11 Februaryi 2018.

He ended his career as a singer on her 40th birthday on 27 November 2018. Nevertheless, he still writes songs for other singers. Concert The Last Altimet Show which was postponed until February 2019 was his last appearance in the world of singing.

Business 
Altimet ran an Islamic concept clothing brand for men and children under the label "Benua Clothing" with a partner who is also a close friend of his, Mohd Nizar Manaf. The label began operating in early May 2014. In addition, he also manages one of the branches of the barber shop, Joe Flizzow.

He also announced he would set up a barber shop franchise and invest in a pizza company and Al-Quran learning app, Recite.

Other appearances 
Altimet is one of the 120 popular celebrities in the country who have made a success of the music initiative project under the control Pete Teo, Malaysian Artistes For Unity (MAFU) aimed at celebrating multiculturalism and ideas Bangsa Malaysia through songs and videos. Celebrities involved include Afdlin Shauki, Awie, Ning Baizura, Jason Lo, Sharifah Amani, Adibah Noor, Maya Karin and others.

He is one of 10 new ambassadors 1M4U. Altimet became an actor in a movie Rentap as a special appearance and became the lead actor in PU Wid in Astro Oasis and Astro Maya HD.

In addition, he also appeared in theatrical plays Ola Bola The Musical, the role of Sarjan Ahmad.

Personal life 
Altimet is married and has three children. He revealed in an Hlive report: "Yes, I've been married for the last 15 years. I shared this during my last concert only to the fans who have supported me over the years because after this I am no longer in the industry."

In politics, Altimet officially joined Parti Keadilan Rakyat (PKR) in April 2021, The main objectives of his participation include helping to achieve his dream of seeing PKR chief  Anwar Ibrahim become the country's leader as well as strengthening the involvement of the arts in the country's politics.

Discography 
Studio Album

 First Among Equals (2007)
 Kotarayaku (2014)
 Air (2018)
 O (2018)

Filmography

Film

Television

Teater

Music Video

Concerts and tours 

 The Last Altimet Show (2019)

Awards and Nominated

References

External links 

 
 

Living people
Malaysian male singers
1978 births
People from Selangor
English singers
Malaysian singer-songwriters
Malaysian television actors
Malaysian television personalities
Malaysian rappers
Malaysian Muslims
Malaysian composers
Malaysian people of Malay descent
Malay-language singers